Park Young-jun (born 28 January 1994) is a Korean handball player for Korea Armed Forces Athletic Corps and the Korean national team.

He represented Korea at the 2019 World Men's Handball Championship.

References

1994 births
Living people
Korean male handball players